Ohene Karikari (born 1 December 1954) is a former sprinter from Ghana, who represented his native West African country at the 1972 Summer Olympics in Munich, West Germany.  He is best known for winning two gold medals (100 and 200 metres) at the 1973 All-Africa Games in Lagos, Nigeria.

Personal bests
100 metres – 10.39 (1979)

References
 

1954 births
Living people
Ghanaian male sprinters
Athletes (track and field) at the 1972 Summer Olympics
Olympic athletes of Ghana
Commonwealth Games medallists in athletics
Athletes (track and field) at the 1974 British Commonwealth Games
Athletes (track and field) at the 1978 Commonwealth Games
Commonwealth Games silver medallists for Ghana
Commonwealth Games bronze medallists for Ghana
African Games gold medalists for Ghana
African Games medalists in athletics (track and field)
Athletes (track and field) at the 1973 All-Africa Games
Alumni of Opoku Ware School
20th-century Ghanaian people
Medallists at the 1974 British Commonwealth Games